The South-East Asian Theatre of World War II consisted of the campaigns of the Pacific War in the Philippines, Thailand, Indonesia, Indochina, Burma, India, Malaya and Singapore between 1941 to 1945.

Japan attacked British and American territories with near-simultaneous offensives against Southeast Asia and the Central Pacific on 7/8 December 1941. Action in this theatre ended when Japan announced an intent to surrender on 15 August 1945. The formal surrender of Japan ceremony took place on 2 September 1945.

Outbreak of hostilities 
Conflict in this theatre began when the Empire of Japan invaded French Indochina in September 1940 and rose to a new level following the Attack on Pearl Harbor, and simultaneous attacks on Hong Kong, the Philippines, Thailand, Singapore and Malaya on 7 and 8 December 1941. The main landing at Singora (now Songkhla) on the east side of the Isthmus of Kra preceded the bombing of Pearl Harbor by several hours.

Although Japan declared war on the United States and the British Empire, the declaration was not delivered until after the attacks began. On 8 December, the United Kingdom, the United States, Canada, and the Netherlands declared war on Japan, followed by China and Australia the next day.

Initial Japanese successes
The Allies suffered many defeats in the first half of the war. Following the invasion, the government of Thailand formally allied itself with Japan on 21 December. Japan invaded Hong Kong in the Battle of Hong Kong on 8 December, culminating in surrender on 25 December. January saw the invasions of Burma and the Dutch East Indies and the capture of Manila and Kuala Lumpur.

Malaya and Singapore
Japanese forces met stiff resistance from III Corps of the Indian Army, the Australian 8th Division, and British units during the Battle of Malaya, but Japan's superiority in air power, tanks and infantry tactics drove the Allied units back. After being driven out of Malaya by the end of January 1942, Allied forces in Singapore, under the command of Lieutenant General Arthur Percival, surrendered to the Japanese on 15 February 1942; about 130,000 Allied troops became prisoners of war. The fall of Singapore was the largest surrender in British military history.

The Japanese Indian Ocean raid
The Japanese Indian Ocean raid was a naval sortie by the Fast Carrier Strike Force of the Imperial Japanese Navy from 31 March to 10 April 1942 against Allied shipping and bases in the Indian Ocean. Following the destruction of the ABDACOM forces in the battles around Java in February and March, the Japanese sortied into the Indian Ocean to destroy British seapower there and support the invasion of Burma. The raid was only partially successful. It did not succeed in destroying Allied naval power in the Indian Ocean but it did force the British fleet to relocate from British Ceylon to Kilindini at Mombasa in Kenya, as their more forward fleet anchorages could not be adequately protected from Japanese attack. The fleet in the Indian Ocean was then gradually reduced to little more than a convoy escort force as other commitments called for the more powerful ships. From May 1942, it was also used in the invasion of Madagascar — an operation aimed at thwarting any attempt by Japan to use bases on the Vichy French controlled territory.

In 1942, Madras City was attacked by a Mitsubishi Rufe, (the Zero's seaplane version) operating from the carrier  which dropped a single bomb near the St. George Fort. The physical damage was negligible, though the public response was major and the city was evacuated because of fears of subsequent Japanese bombing and invasion. Many rich families from Madras moved permanently to the hill stations in fear.

Also in 1942 in preparation for a possible Japanese invasion of India, the British began improvements to the Kodaikanal-Munnar Road to facilitate its use as an evacuation route from Kodaikanal along the southern crest of the Palani Hills to Top Station. Existing roads then continued to Munnar and down to Cochin where British ships would be available for evacuation out of India.

Japanese occupation of the Andaman and Nicobar Islands

The Andaman and Nicobar Islands (8,293 km² on 139 islands) are a group of islands situated in the Bay of Bengal at about 780 miles from Kolkata (known at the time as Calcutta), 740 miles from Chennai (known at the time as Madras) and 120 miles from Cape Nargis in Burma. On 23 March 1942 a Japanese invasion force seized the islands and occupied them until the end of the war.

On 29 December 1943, political control of the islands was theoretically passed to the Azad Hind government of Subhas Chandra Bose. Bose visited Port Blair to raise the tricolour flag of the Indian National Army. After Bose's departure the Japanese remained in effective control of the Andamans, and the sovereignty of the Arzi Hukumat-e Hind was largely fictional. The islands themselves were renamed "Shaheed" and "Swaraj", meaning "martyr" and "self-rule" respectively. Bose placed the islands under the governorship of Lt Col. A. D. Loganathan, and had limited involvement with the administration of the territory.

Burma Campaign

 The retreat of the Burma Corps
 The formation of the British Fourteenth Army (The "Forgotten Army")
 The Arakan Campaign
 The Japanese attack on India
 The Allied counter offensives
 Road to Rangoon
 Brigadier Orde Wingate and the Chindits

US forces in the China Burma India Theatre

 Northern Combat Area Command (NCAC)
 Flying Tigers
 Fourteenth Air Force
 Tenth Air Force
 Twentieth Air Force (Operation Matterhorn)
 The Allied logistical airlift from India into China over the Hump
 The Ledo Road
 Merrill's Marauders

One of the major logistical efforts of the war was "flying the Hump" over the Himalayas and the building of the Ledo Road from India to China as a replacement for the Burma Road.

Air war in South East Asia
 RAF Far East Air Force
 RAF Third Tactical Air Force
 Bombing of South-East Asia (1944–45)

RAF battle honours:
 CEYLON 1942
Qualification: For operations against Japanese aircraft and naval units by squadrons based in Ceylon during the Japanese attacks of April 1942.
 BURMA 1944–1945
Qualification: For operations during the 14th Army's advance from Imphal to Rangoon, the coastal amphibious assaults, and the Battle of Pegu Yomas, August 1944 to August 1945.

Indian Ocean naval campaigns 1942–1945

The earliest successes were gained by mine laying and submarine warfare. The Japanese minesweeping capability was never great, and when confronted with new types of mines they did not adapt quickly. Japanese shipping was driven from the Burmese coast using this type of warfare. British submarines based in British Ceylon operated against Japanese shipping.

It was only after the war in Europe was clearly coming to an end that large British forces were dispatched to the Indian Ocean again. Following the neutralisation of the German fleet in late 1943 and early 1944, forces from the Home Fleet were released, and the success of Operation Overlord in June meant even more craft could be sent, including precious amphibious assault shipping.

During late 1944, as more British aircraft carriers came into the area a series of strikes were flown against oil targets in Sumatra, such as Operation Meridian.  was lent for the first attack by the United States. The oil installations were heavily damaged by the attacks, aggravating the Japanese fuel shortages due to the American blockade. The final attack was flown as the carriers were heading for Sydney to become the British Pacific Fleet.

After the departure of the main battle forces the Indian Ocean was left with escort carriers and older battleships as the mainstay of its naval forces. Nevertheless, during those months important operations were launched in the recapture of Burma, including landings on Ramree and Akyab and near Rangoon.

Command structures

Allied command structure
At the start of the war the British had two commands with responsibilities for possessions in the theatre. India Command under General Sir Archibald Wavell the Commander-in-Chief (CinC) of the Army of India and the Far East Command, first under Air Chief Marshal Robert Brooke-Popham and then from 23 December 1941 commanded by Lieutenant-General Sir Henry Royds Pownall.

India Command was responsible for British India, British Ceylon, and for some of the time Burma. The Far East Command based in Singapore was responsible for Hong Kong, Malaya, Singapore and other British Far East possessions including, for some of the time, Burma.

A month after the outbreak of war with Japan on 7 December 1941, the Allied governments jointly appointed the British Commander-in-Chief (CinC) of the Army of India, General Sir Archibald Wavell, as Supreme Allied Commander of all "American-British-Dutch-Australian" (ABDA) forces in South East Asia and the Pacific, from Burma to the Dutch East Indies.

However, advances made by the Japanese over the next month split the ABDA forces in two. After transferring the forces in Burma to the India Command, on 25 February 1942 Wavell resigned as commander of the ABDA and resumed his position of CinC of the Army of India. Responsibility for the South West Pacific Area passed to US General Douglas MacArthur as Supreme Allied Commander South West Pacific.

From February 1942 until November 1943 the India Command was responsible for the South East Asian Theatre. General Wavell was made Viceroy of India and General Claude Auchinleck became Commander-in-Chief of the India Command on 20 June 1943. In August 1943 the Allies formed a new South East Asian Command to take over strategic responsibilities for the theatre.

The reorganisation of the theatre command took about two months. On 4 October Winston Churchill appointed Admiral Lord Louis Mountbatten supreme Allied commander of the South East Asia Command (SEAC). The American General Joseph Stilwell was the first deputy supreme Allied commander. On 15 November, Auchinleck handed over responsibility for the conduct of operations against the Japanese in the theatre to Mountbatten.

The initial land forces operational area for SEAC included India, Burma, British Ceylon and Malaya. Operations were also mounted in Japanese-occupied Sumatra, Thailand and French Indochina (Vietnam, Cambodia, and Laos).

Initially SEAC commanded:
 British Eastern Fleet (based in Ceylon)
 British 11th Army Group (Commonwealth land forces; HQ in New Delhi)
 Air HQ India (New Delhi)
 China Burma India Theater (CBI), (all US forces in theatre; HQ in New Delhi).

In October 1944, CBI was split into US Forces China Theater (USFCT) and India-Burma Theater (USFIBT).

On 12 November 1944 Eleventh Army Group redesignated by Allied Land Forces South East Asia (ALFSEA) combining Commonwealth and US forces, with an HQ at Kandy. On 1 December ALFSEA HQ moved to Barrackpore, India.

On 15 August 1945 responsibility for the rest of the Dutch East Indies was transferred from the South West Pacific Area to SEAC.

SEAC was disbanded on 30 November 1946.

11th Army Group
British 11th Army Group ( November 1943 – 12 November 1944) was on paper the main Commonwealth army force in South East Asia which directed
 British Fourteenth Army
 British Army in Ceylon (Ceylon Army)
 Northern Combat Area Command under the command of Joseph Stilwell.

On 12 November 1944 the 11th Army Group was redesignated Allied Land Forces South East Asia, still under SEAC, because it was felt that an inter-Allied command was better than the purely British headquarters. Command problems with General Stilwell and his interactions with the U.S. Joint Chiefs of Staff had precipitated the change.

Japanese command structure
The Imperial Japanese Army Unit controlling all army land and air units in South East Asia and the South West Pacific was the Southern Expeditionary Army headquartered in Saigon, Indochina. It was commanded by General Count Hisaichi Terauchi, who commanded it from 1941 to 1945. The Japanese also deployed the South Seas Force, a combined force of Army and Special Naval Landing Force personnel. The Southern Army's major field commands were the 14th Army, the 15th Army, the 16th Army and the 25th Army. These consisted of 11 infantry divisions, six independent infantry brigades, and six tank regiments, plus artillery and support troops. The Japanese extensively used bicycle infantry, which allowed them quick movement over vast distances.

See also
 British Indian Army
 Indian National Army
 Burma National Army
 Thai Phayap Army
 Korean Liberation Army
 Military history of Britain during World War II#The Far East
 Pacific War
 Pacific Theater of Operations
 Second Sino-Japanese War
 Kantogun

Footnotes

Notes

References

 
 
 
 Jon Latimer, Burma: The Forgotten War, London: John Murray, 2004.  * William Slim, Defeat Into Victory, London: Cassell, 1956.
 Seki, Eiji. (2006).  Mrs. Ferguson's Tea-Set, Japan and the Second World War: The Global Consequences Following Germany's Sinking of the SS Automedon in 1940. London: Global Oriental.  (cloth) [reprinted by University of Hawaii Press, Honolulu, 2007 –  previously announced as Sinking of the SS Automedon and the Role of the Japanese Navy: A New Interpretation.]
 William Slim, Defeat Into Victory, London: Cassell, 1956.

External links
 Parliamentary Debates, "House of Commons Official Report, Jan. 27, 1942". on the Far Eastern theatre and A.B.D.A
 STRATEGIC PLANNING FOR COALITION WARFARE 1941–1942: Chapter VI: ARMY DEPLOYMENT AND THE WAR AGAINST JAPAN December 1941 – March 1942
 National Army Museum
 BBC Article on the Burma Campaign
 Forgotten Warriors: China-Burma-India

 
WW2
South-East Asian
1940s in Southeast Asia
Theaters and campaigns of World War II
WW2